At the time of the American Civil War (1861–1865), Canada did not yet exist as a federated nation. Instead, British North America consisted of the Province of Canada (parts of modern southern Ontario and southern Quebec) and the separate colonies of Newfoundland, New Brunswick, Prince Edward Island, Nova Scotia, British Columbia and Vancouver Island, as well as a crown territory administered by the Hudson's Bay Company called Rupert's Land.  Britain and its colonies were officially neutral for the duration of the war. Despite this, tensions between Britain and the United States were high due to incidents on the seas, such as the  Trent Affair and the Confederate commissioning of the CSS Alabama from Britain.

Canadians were largely opposed to slavery, and Canada had recently become the terminus of the Underground Railroad. Close economic and cultural links across the long border, also encouraged Canadian sympathy towards the Union. Between 33,000 and 55,000 men from British North America enlisted in the war, almost all of them fighting for Union forces. Some press and churches in Canada supported the secession, and some others did not. There was talk in London in 1861–62 of mediating the war or recognizing the Confederacy. Washington warned this meant war, and London feared Canada would quickly be seized by the Union army.

Trent Affair

In November 1861 tensions escalated between Washington and London when an American warship stopped the British mail ship  on the high seas and seized two Confederate diplomats, James Mason and John Slidell. London demanded their return and an apology, and to signal its intention to defend its possessions sent 14,000 combat troops to Canada and the Maritimes, while the Canadians planned to raise 40,000 militia. President Abraham Lincoln defused the crisis by releasing the diplomats, though he did not issue an apology. He cautioned his Secretary of State William H. Seward, "One war at a time."  The British decided that unification of the North American colonies was now a high priority, as a new strong dominion would relieve London of the need to station large British forces to defend British North America.

The Grand Trunk Railway Brigade 

Rising concerns over the security of railways in Canada while the Civil War raged in the United States led to the 1862 creation of the Grand Trunk Railway Brigade. This unit of Canadian Volunteer Militia recruited amongst railway employees had infantry and artillery companies deployed along the railway lines in Canada East and Canada West.

Confederate activity in British North America

Confederate operators secretly used Canada and particularly the Maritimes as a base, in violation of British neutrality. The Maritimes' struggle to maintain their independence from Canada led some Maritimers to be sympathetic to the South's desire to maintain its independence from the North. For example, Halifax merchant Benjamin Wier (1805–1868) acted as Halifax agent for many of the Confederate blockade runners active during the Civil War. In return for ship repair facilities in Halifax, the Confederates supplied him with valuable cotton for re-export to Britain, a lucrative but hazardous course for Wier which required severing his business connections with New England.

Chesapeake

On 7 December 1863, while the new Union tug Chesapeake was preparing for service in the South Atlantic Blockading Squadron, 17 Confederate agents disguised as passengers seized it off Cape Cod, Massachusetts. Word of the takeover reached Portland on the morning of 9 December and quickly spread from there. The news prompted federal officials at northern ports along the coast to speedy action.

On 17 December, the recently captured blockade runner Ella and Annie — which had been hastily manned, armed and sent to sea — caught up with the Chesapeake at Sambro, Nova Scotia. Shortly thereafter, the Northern gunboat  arrived on the scene; and its commanding officer prevented Ella and Annie from taking the recaptured tug back to Boston, lest such action seriously undermine British–U.S. relations. Instead, to observe diplomatic protocols, he escorted Chesapeake to Halifax where he asked the colonial Admiralty court to restore it to its owner. The court ruled the Confederate attack was illegal and returned SS Chesapeake to its Union owners but the Confederate sympathizers escaped with the help of some Haligonians, creating tensions that received international attention.

CSS Tallahassee 
On 18 August 1864, the Confederate States Ship  under the command of John Taylor Wood sailed into Halifax harbour for supplies, coal and to make repairs to its mainmast. Wood could only stay 48 hours under neutrality laws and began loading coal at Woodside, on the Dartmouth shore. Union ships Nansemont and Huron were making their way toward Halifax when Wood slipped out of the harbor at 9 p.m. on 19 August. It is believed he departed by the seldom-used Eastern Passage between McNabs Island and the Dartmouth shore to avoid Union warships in case they had arrived.  The channel was narrow and crooked with a shallow tide, so Wood hired a local pilot, Jock Flemming. All the lights were out, but the residents on the Eastern Passage mainland could see the dark hull moving through the water, successfully evading capture.

St. Albans Raid

The most-controversial incident was the St. Albans Raid. Montreal was used as the secret base for a team of Confederates attempting to launch covert and intelligence operations from Canada against the United States. To finance their cause in October 1864, they robbed three banks in St. Albans, Vermont, killed an American citizen, and escaped with US$170,000. They were pursued across the Canada–U.S. border by Union forces, creating an international incident. The Canadians then arrested the Confederate raiders, but the judge ruled the raid was an authorized Confederate government operation, not a felony, which would have permitted extradition via the Webster–Ashburton Treaty.

Many Americans falsely suspected that the Canadian government knew of the raid ahead of time. There was widespread anger when the raiders were released by a local court in Canada. The U.S. Secretary of State William H. Seward let the British government know, "it is impossible to consider those proceedings as either legal, just or friendly towards the United States."

Canadian fighters

The best recent estimates are that between 33,000 and 55,000 men from British North America (BNA) served in the Union army, and a few hundred in the Confederate army. Many of them already lived in the United States and were joined by volunteers signed up in Canada by Union recruiters.

Canada refused to return about 15,000 American deserters and draft dodgers.

Calixa Lavallée was a French-Canadian musician and Union officer during the American Civil War who later composed the music for "O Canada", which officially became the national anthem of Canada in 1980. In 1857, he moved to the United States and lived in Rhode Island where he enlisted in the 4th Rhode Island Volunteers of the Union army during the American Civil War, attaining the rank of lieutenant.

Canadian-born Edward P. Doherty was a Union Army officer who formed and led the detachment of Union soldiers that captured and killed John Wilkes Booth, the assassin of Lincoln, in a Virginia barn on April 26, 1865, 12 days after Lincoln was fatally shot.

Canadian-born Sarah Emma Edmonds was a noted Union spy.

One of the longest-living Canadians to have fought in the American Civil War was James Beach Moore, who died on August 29, 1931.

Anderson Ruffin Abbott was a Toronto-born son of free people of color who had fled Alabama after their store was ransacked. Canada's first Black physician, he applied for a commission as an assistant surgeon in the Union Army in February 1863, but his offer was evidently not accepted.  That April, he applied to be a "medical cadet" in the United States Colored Troops, but was finally accepted as a civilian surgeon under contract.  He served in Washington, D.C., from June 1863 to August 1865, first at the Contraband Hospital which became Freedmen's Hospital. He then went to a hospital in Arlington, Virginia. Receiving numerous commendations and becoming popular in Washington society, Abbott was one of only 13 black surgeons to serve in the Civil War, a fact that fostered a friendly relationship between him and the president. On the night of Lincoln's assassination, Abbott accompanied Elizabeth Keckley to the Petersen House and returned to his lodgings that evening. After Lincoln's death, Mary Todd Lincoln presented Abbott with the plaid shawl that Lincoln had worn to his 1861 inauguration.

At least 29 Canadian-born men were awarded the Medal of Honor.

Economic effects
The Civil War period was one of booming economic growth for the BNA colonies. The war in the United States created a huge market for Canada's agricultural and manufactured goods, most of which went to the Union. Maritime shipbuilders and owners prospered in the wartime trade boom.

Political effects
The American Civil War had decisive political effects on the BNA colonies. The tensions between the United States and Britain, which had been ignited by the war and made worse by the Fenian raids, led to concern for the security and independence of the colonies, helping to consolidate momentum for the confederation of the colonies in 1867.

In this regard, the conflict also had an important effect on discussions concerning the nature of the emerging federation.  Many Fathers of Confederation concluded that the secessionist war was caused by too much power being given to the states, and thus resolved to create a more centralized federation. It was also believed that too much democracy was a contributing factor and the Canadian system was thus equipped with checks and balances such as the appointed Senate and powers of the British appointed Governor General.  The guiding principles of the legislation which created Canada – the British North America Act – were peace, order, and good government.  This was a collectivist antithesis to American individualism that became central to Canadian identity.

See also
 Military history of Nova Scotia
 United Kingdom and the American Civil War
 Bahamas and the American Civil War
 France and the American Civil War 
Foreign enlistment in the American Civil War

References

Bibliography

 Adams, Ephraim Douglass. Great Britain and the American Civil War (2 vol. 1925)
 Bourne, Kenneth. British Preparations for War with the North, 1861-1862. The English Historical Review Vol 76 No 301 (Oct 1961) pp 600–632
 Bovey, Wilfrid. "Confederate Agents in Canada During the American Civil War,"  Canadian Historical Review (1921) 2#1 pp: 46–57  online
 Boyko, John. Blood and Daring: How Canada Fought the American Civil War and Forged a Nation (2013)
 Careless, J.M.S.  Brown of the Globe: Volume Two: Statesman of Confederation 1860-1880. (vol 2 1963) on George Brown, Toronto publisher & politician; excerpt
 Crook, David Paul. Diplomacy during the American Civil War (1975), on Canadian diplomacy
 Ferris, Norman B. Desperate Diplomacy: William H. Seward's Foreign Policy, 1861. (1976) 265pp., On Union diplomacy
 Hubbard, Charles M. The Burden of Confederate Diplomacy (1998) 271pp
 Jenkins, Brian. Britain and the War for the Union. (2 vol 1974), by a Canadian scholar
 Jenkins, Danny R.  "British North Americans who fought in the American Civil War, 1861-1865," (MA thesis, U. Of Ottawa, 1993), online edition.
 Jones, Howard. Abraham Lincoln and a New Birth of Freedom: the Union and Slavery in the Diplomacy of the Civil War, (1999)
 Jones, Preston. "Civil War, Culture War: French Quebec and the American War between the States," Catholic Historical Review. 87#`1 (2001). pp 55+ online edition
 Kazar, John D. "The Canadian View of the Confederate Raid on Saint Albans," Vermont History 1964 (1): 255–273,
 Macdonald, Helen Grace. Canadian Public Opinion and the American Civil War (1926)
 Marquis, Greg. Armageddon's Shadow: The Civil War and Canada's Maritime Provinces. (McGill-Queen's University Press, 1998)  online
 Mayers, Adam. Dixie & the Dominion: Canada, the Confederacy, and the War for the Union (Toronto: Dundurn, 2003) online, a standard scholarly history
 Morton, W.L. The Critical Years: The Union of British North America, 1857-1873 (1964)
 Owsley, Frank Lawrence. King Cotton Diplomacy: Foreign Relations of the Confederate States of America (1931)
 Shippee, L.B. Canadian-American Relations, 1849–1874 (Yale UP, 1939)
 Stouffer, Allen P. "Canadian-American Relations in the Shadow of the Civil War," Dalhousie Review 1977 57(2): 332-346
 Wilson, Dennis K. Justice under Pressure: The Saint Albans Raid  and Its Aftermath (1992). 224 pp.
 Winks Robin W. Canada and the United States: The Civil War Years (1971). onlinw, a standard scholarly history

External links 
Canada Civil War Association
"American Civil War" The Canadian Encyclopedia.
 Canadians in the American Civil War
Franco-Americans 

American Civil War
American Civil War by location
Canada–United States military relations
Foreign relations during the American Civil War
Political history of Canada
Military history of Canada
Military history of Nova Scotia
Internal wars of the United States
1860s in Canada